Element Electronics is a privately held American consumer electronics company in South Carolina.

History 
Element TVs were first developed in China and sold in the US. Later they decided to open up in the United States. It is managed by element electronics in the United States. In 2012, Element opened its  plant in Winnsboro, South Carolina. The plant is estimated to bring 500 jobs to the Winnsboro area over a period of five years.

Campaigns 
Heisman Trophy winner and Fox Sports analyst Matt Leinart starred in a national TV campaign for Element Electronics in the fall of 2016. The campaign included an Element-branded, on-air integration on Fox Sports called “Right Moves with Matt Leinart”, featuring Leinart breaking down the best college football plays of the week. This was Element Electronics’ first national TV campaign.

Products 
Element Electronics offers TVs with integrated JBL sound bars as well as Roku integrated smart TVs.

References 

Electronics companies of the United States
Manufacturing companies based in South Carolina
Fairfield County, South Carolina
Consumer electronics brands
Display technology companies
Privately held companies based in South Carolina